Eparchy of Cairo may refer to:
 Maronite Catholic Eparchy of Cairo
 Chaldean Catholic Eparchy of Cairo
 Syriac Catholic Eparchy of Cairo